Kildrum is a village located in County Donegal, Ireland.

References

Towns and villages in County Donegal